Monochamus verticalis is a species of beetle in the family Cerambycidae. It was described by Léon Fairmaire in 1901.

References

verticalis
Beetles described in 1901